Shahriar Hossain is a Bangladeshi cricketer who played in 3 Tests from 2000 to 2004.He was also one of the members of the inaugural Test for Bangladesh the member of the 1999 World Cup Team.

In Test matches
He failed in the match against India, scoring just 12 & 7. In his next match, four years later, he scored his highest, 48, against Zimbabwe at Harare. Nevertheless, he was dropped after the tour.

In ODIs
He had a very successful 1999. At Dhaka, in March, he scored 95 against Kenya, narrowly missing out on his chance to become the first Bangladeshi to score a hundred in ODI. later, he scored 68 against more powerful Zimbabwe. In this match, he shared a 170 run first wicket partnership with Mehrab Hossain. In the WC, his 39 against Pakistan at Northampton helped Bangladesh achieve a famous win. He finished the year with knocks of 45 & 47 against West Indies at Dhaka. Injuries, however, has shortened his international career.

Other matches
In 1993, he was part of the Bangladesh U-19 team. In 95, he played for the Bangladesh A side. In 1996, he represented the full national squad.

References

External links

Bangladeshi cricketers
1976 births
Living people
Bangladesh Test cricketers
Bangladesh One Day International cricketers
Cricketers at the 1999 Cricket World Cup
Dhaka Division cricketers
Cricketers at the 1998 Commonwealth Games
Commonwealth Games competitors for Bangladesh
Wicket-keepers
People from Narayanganj District